In quantum mechanics, a raising or lowering operator (collectively known as ladder operators) is an operator that increases or decreases the eigenvalue of another operator.  In quantum mechanics, the raising operator is sometimes called the creation operator, and the lowering operator the annihilation operator. Well-known applications of ladder operators in quantum mechanics are in the formalisms of the quantum harmonic oscillator and angular momentum.

Introduction
Another type of operator in quantum field theory, discovered in the early 1970s, is known as the anti-symmetric operator.  This operator, similar to spin in non-relativistic quantum mechanics is a ladder operator that can create two fermions of opposite spin out of a boson or a boson from two fermions.  A Fermion, named after Enrico Fermi, is a particle with a half-integer spin, such as electrons and protons.  This is a matter particle.  A  boson, named after  S. N. Bose, is a particle with full integer spin, such as  photons and W's.  This is a  force carrying particle.

Spin
First, we will review spin for non-relativistic quantum mechanics. Spin, an intrinsic property similar to angular momentum, is defined by a spin operator S that plays a role on a system similar to the operator L for orbital angular momentum. These ladder operators act on the state in the following  and  respectively.

The operators S_x and S_y can be determined using the ladder method. The matrix representations of these operators are constructed as follows:

 

 

Therefore,  and  can be represented by the matrix representations:

Therefore, like orbital angular momentum, we can only specify one coordinate at a time.

Application in quantum field theory
The creation of a particle and anti-particle from a boson is defined similarly but for infinite dimensions.  Therefore, the Levi-Civita symbol for infinite dimensions is introduced.

The commutation relations are simply carried over to infinite dimensions .   is now equal to  where n=∞. Defining the magnetic quantum number, angular momentum projected in the z direction, is more challenging than the simple state of spin. The problem becomes analogous to moment of inertia in classical mechanics and is generalizable to n dimensions. It is this property that allows for the creation and annihilation of bosons.

Bosons

Characterized by their spin, a bosonic field can be scalar fields, vector fields and even tensor fields.  To illustrate, the electromagnetic field quantized is the photon field, which can be quantized using conventional methods of canonical or path integral quantization. This has led to the theory of quantum electrodynamics, arguably the most successful theory in physics.  The graviton field is the quantized gravitational field. There is yet to be a theory that quantizes the gravitational field, but theories such as string theory can be thought of the gravitational field quantized. An example of a non-relativistic bosonic field is that describing cold bosonic atoms, such as Helium-4.  Free bosonic fields obey commutation relations:

,

To illustrate, suppose we have a system of N bosons that occupy mutually orthogonal single-particle states , etc.  Using the usual representation, we demonstrate the system by assigning a state to each particle and then imposing exchange symmetry.

This wave equation can be represented using a second quantized approach, known as second quantization.  The number of particles in each single-particle state is listed.

The creation and annihilation operators, which add and subtract particles from multi-particle states. These creation and annihilation operators are very similar to those defined for the quantum harmonic oscillator, which added and subtracted energy quanta. However, these operators literally create and annihilate particles with a given quantum state. The bosonic annihilation operator  and creation operator  have the following effects:

Like the creation and annihilation operators  and  also found in quantum field theory, the creation and annihilation operators  and  act on bosons in multi-particle states.  While  and  allows us to determine whether a particle was created or destroyed in a system, the spin operators  and  allow us to determine how.  A photon can become both a positron and electron and vice versa.  Because of the anti-symmetric statistics, a particle of spin  obeys the Pauli-Exclusion Rule.  Two particles can exist in the same state if and only if the spin of the particle is opposite.

Back to our example, the spin state of the particle is spin-1.  Symmetric particles, or bosons, need not obey the Pauli-Exclusion Principle so therefore we can represent the spin state of the particle as follows:

 and 

The annihilation spin operator, as its name implies, annihilates a photon into both an electron and positron.  Likewise, the creation spin operator creates a photon.  The photon can be in either the first state or the second state in this example.  If we apply the linear momentum operator

Fermions
In the case of the non-relativistic particle, if  is applied to a fermion twice, the resulting eigenvalue is 0. Similarly, the eigenvalue is 0 when  is applied to a fermion twice. This relation satisfies the Pauli Exclusion Principle. However, bosons are symmetric particles, which do not obey the Pauli Exclusion Principle.

References

Quantum mechanics
Quantum field theory